Bounnan Bounyaseng is a Laotian politician. He is a member of the Lao People's Revolutionary Party. He is a representative of the National Assembly of Laos for Attapu Province (Constituency 17)

References

Members of the National Assembly of Laos
Year of birth missing (living people)
Living people
Lao People's Revolutionary Party politicians
People from Attapeu province